Paint Creek site (14MP1) is an historical site near Lindsborg in McPherson County, Kansas. This ancestral Wichita village is considered part of the Little River focus of the Great Bend aspect and was occupied around 1300 to 1650 CE.

The site was added to the National Register of Historic Places in 1972.

References

Archaeological sites on the National Register of Historic Places in Kansas
Geography of McPherson County, Kansas
National Register of Historic Places in McPherson County, Kansas
Plains Village period
Wichita tribe
Former Native American populated places in the United States